{{DISPLAYTITLE:Chi2 Hydrae}}

Chi2 Hydrae, Latinised from χ2 Hydrae, is a binary star system in the equatorial constellation of Hydra. Based upon an annual parallax shift of 4.6 mas as seen from Earth, it is located roughly 685 light years from the Sun. It is visible to the naked eye with a combined apparent visual magnitude of about 5.7.

This is a detached eclipsing binary star system with an orbital period of 2.27 days and an essentially circular orbit having a measured eccentricity of 0.00. The eclipse of the primary by the secondary component reduces the visual magnitude of the system by 0.29, while the eclipse of the secondary diminishes the magnitude by 0.27.

The primary, component A, is a magnitude 5.85 B-type star with a stellar classification of B8 III-IVe, suggesting it may be part way along the path of evolving into a giant star from a subgiant. It has about 3.6 times the mass of the Sun and 4.4 times the Sun's radius, although it may be tidally deformed since its radius is 86% of the Roche radius. With an estimated age of 158 million years, it has a projected rotational velocity of 112 km/s.

Component B is a magnitude 7.57 B-type main sequence star with a class of B8.5 V. It has 2.6 times the Sun's mass and 2.16 times the radius of the Sun. The star is filling 60% of its Roche radius.

References

B-type giants
B-type subgiants
B-type main-sequence stars
Eclipsing binaries
Hydra (constellation)
Hydrae, Chi2
096314
054255
4317
Durchmusterung objects